"Leaving Eden" is a song by Christian contemporary-alternative rock musician Brandon Heath from his third studio album, Leaving Eden. It was released in October 2011, as the third and last single from the album.

Background 
This song was produced by Dan Muckala.

Composition 
"Leaving Eden" was written by Brandon Heath and Lee Thomas Miller.

Release 
The song "Leaving Eden" was digitally released as the third and final single from Leaving Eden in October 2011.

Charts

References 

2011 singles
Brandon Heath songs
Songs written by Brandon Heath
Songs written by Lee Thomas Miller
Song recordings produced by Dan Muckala